A nunchaku is an Okinawan martial arts weapon.

Nunchaku or Nunchuk may also refer to:

 Nunchaku (Isabelle), a tool of the Isabelle proof assistant
 Nunchuk (G.I. Joe), a fictional character in the G.I. Joe universe
 Nunchuk (controller), a Wii Remote expansion

See also 
 "Nunchucks", a song by Doja Cat from the EP Purrr! (2014)